Alex Blair (born 16 November 1990) is a Scotland 'A' international rugby union player.

Rugby Union career

Amateur career

Impressing for Edinburgh Academicals, he was offered a contract by Edinburgh Rugby in 2010.

While with Edinburgh Rugby he played for Melrose.

He turned out for Edinburgh Academicals again when he was released by Edinburgh Rugby in 2011.

He played for Southern Districts in Australia in the summer of 2013.

When he was offered a trial to return to Edinburgh Rugby he was still playing for Edinburgh Academicals.

Professional career

Blair signed for Edinburgh Rugby in 2010. He played one match against Leinster in the Pro12.

He was released a year later in 2011 due to a back injury.

He had a spell with Sale Sharks.

He was offered the chance to train with Edinburgh Rugby again in 2013.

International career

He played for Scotland U20s.

Blair was capped by Scotland 'A'.

Outside of rugby union

Blair studied sports science at Edinburgh College.

References

1990 births
Living people
Scottish rugby union players
Sale Sharks players
Edinburgh Rugby players
Scotland 'A' international rugby union players
Edinburgh Academicals rugby union players
Melrose RFC players
Rugby union players from Edinburgh
Rugby union fly-halves